The Copa del Rey 2008-09 was the 73rd edition of the Spanish basketball Cup. It was managed by the ACB and was disputed in Madrid, Community of Madrid in the Palacio de Deportes between days 19 and 22 of February. The winning team was TAU Cerámica.

Bracket

Quarterfinals

Semifinals

Final

MVP of the Tournament: Mirza Teletović

Television broadcasting
TVE2, FORTA and Teledeporte.

Organizer
ACB and the Ayuntamiento de Madrid.

Sponsorships
Mahou-San Miguel, AXA, Orange and RENFE.

External links
2008/2009 Copa del Rey Official Website

Copa del Rey de Baloncesto
2008–09 in Spanish basketball cups